The  was an administrative post not of Cabinet rank in the government of the Empire of Japan, responsible for keeping the Privy Seal of Japan and State Seal of Japan. The modern office of the Lord Keeper of the Privy Seal was identical with the old Naidaijin only in name and should not be confused. The office was abolished in 1946 after World War II.

History

Meiji period
The modern office of the Lord Keeper of the Privy Seal was formed in 1885, after the Meiji government established the Japanese cabinet; however, the Lord Keeper of the Privy Seal was separate from the cabinet, and acted as a direct, personal advisor to the Emperor.  He was also responsible for the administration of imperial documents such as rescripts and edicts. Petitions to the emperor and the court were also handled by the Lord Keeper's office, as well as the responses.

When the Privy Council was created in 1888, the Privy Seal retained his independent advisory role.  The term privy in Privy Council and Privy Seal identifies a direct relationship of special trust.

Shōwa period
After the start of Emperor Hirohito's reign in 1925, the office and position of the Lord Keeper of the Privy Seal became increasingly important, at the expense of the office of the Prime Minister. Political infighting within the Diet of Japan further boosted the power of the Lord Keeper. The holder of this position was able to strictly control who was allowed to have an audience with the emperor, as well as the flow of information.

The office of the Lord Keeper of the Privy Seal was officially abolished on 24 November 1945, and the position itself was abolished with the promulgation of the new constitution in November 1946. Thus, former Grand Chamberlain Fujita Hisanori was the last Lord Keeper.

Today, the seals are kept in the care of the Chamberlain of Japan.

List of officeholders

See also
 Lord Privy Seal
 Keeper of the Seals

Notes

References
 Takenobu, Yoshitaro. (1928). The Japan Yearbook; Complete Cyclopaedia of General Information and Statistics on Japan and Japanese Territories. Tokyo: The Japan Year Book Office.  OCLC 145151778

External links
 National Archives of Japan ...Click link for photograph of meeting of Privy Counsel (1946)
 Article on the abolishment of the position of Lord Keeper of the Privy Seal from Japanese Press Translations

1885 establishments in Japan
1946 disestablishments in Japan
Politics of the Empire of Japan